Georges-Jacques Aelsters (1770 – 11 April 1849) was a carillonneur and composer from Ghent.

He was born into a musical family at Ghent. He was carillonneur of that town from 1788 to 1839.

Flemish composers
Carillonneurs
Classical composers of church music
Musicians from Ghent
1770 births
1849 deaths
19th-century keyboardists